MaKee K. Blaisdell (November 15, 1931 – February 21, 1988) was an American actor.  One of his major roles was playing the title character in the short film Johnny Lingo.

Career
Blaisdell was born and raised in Hawaii.  He received his bachelor's degree from Brigham Young University.  Blaisdell had minor roles in two 1966 films, Paradise, Hawaiian Style and The Last of the Secret Agents?.  He also acted on TV, making a few appearances on Star Trek, Daniel Boone, The Big Valley, Mission: Impossible, Whale Rider, and Hawaiian Eye.

Filmography

Sources
LDS film bios

Paul Skousen.  Brother Paul's Mormon Bathroom Reader. (Springville, Utah: Cedar Fort, Inc., 2005) p. 169.

1931 births
Brigham Young University alumni
American male film actors
American male television actors
1988 deaths
20th-century American male actors
Male actors from Hawaii